Sam Potolicchio (/pɒtɒˈlɪkɪɒ/) is a professor specializing in government, leadership and political communications. He serves as Director of Global and Custom Education at Georgetown University's McCourt School of Public Policy Executive Education program and Distinguished Professor and Department Chair of Political Communications at the Russian Presidential Academy of National Economy and Public Administration (RANEPA). Potolicchio is founder and President of the Preparing Global Leaders Forum (PGLF), an international leadership training program with campuses in Russia, Croatia and Jordan.

Education
Potolicchio graduated from Georgetown's College of Arts and Sciences with B.A. degrees in both psychology and government. He went on to earn an M.T.S. in Theology and Culture from Harvard University's Divinity School and an M.A. and PhD in Government from Georgetown's Graduate School of Arts and Sciences.

Career
Potolicchio teaches at Georgetown University, RANEPA and New York University.

Since 2015, Potolicchio has served as Director of Global and Custom Education at the McCourt School of Public Policy at Georgetown University.
 He is the academic director of Georgetown’s Global Visiting Student Program and a lecturer at Georgetown's Global Education Institute (GGEI), where he lectures to senior government officials and corporate executives from emerging economies, including China and Japan.

In 2013, Potolicchio was named Distinguished Professor and Department Chair in Political Communications at the RANEPA's School of Public Policy. In 2016, he started the first English language bachelors program in global governance and leadership in Russia.

Potolicchio founded and serves as President of the Preparing Global Leaders Forum (PGLF), which convenes and trains rising leaders from around the world. PGLF is composed of Preparing Global Leaders Summit in Moscow, Russia, Preparing Global Leaders Croatia in Zagreb, Croatia and Preparing Global Leaders Academy in Amman, Jordan.

Potolicchio is the official lecturer on American Federalism for the Open World Leadership Program at the Library of Congress, where he lectures to delegations from post-Soviet countries. He has delivered keynote lectures at over 200 different universities in 75 countries including Oxford, Yale, Cambridge, Sorbonne, LSE, Brown, Dartmouth, Bologna and Warwick. In addition to public lectures, Potolicchio advises political and business leaders internationally and conducts training with corporate audiences.

Potolicchio is the Distinguished Scholar at the Canterbury School of Fort Myers where he also provides the academic foundation for the Leadership Institute for Tomorrow (LIFT). Previously he was the scholar-in-residence at the Landon School where he had taught fifth grade Latin and served as assistant director of admissions. Potolicchio was, along with Senator Richard Lugar, the Senior Lecturer at the University of Indianapolis Lugar Academy Washington Semester program.

As a youth basketball coach he guided his team, the Jelleff Hoyas, to 6 undefeated championship seasons.

Awards
In 2012, Princeton Review named Potolicchio one of the “Best Professors in America”, the only professor chosen from his field. Prior to that, Potolicchio received the K. Patricia Cross Award from the Association of American Colleges and Universities in 2011, as one of the future leaders of American higher education. In 2017, Potolicchio was named a winner of the OZY Educator Award, as one of the six most outstanding American educators. He has won numerous teaching awards at Georgetown University.

Publications
Potolicchio is a columnist for Newsweek Japan, where his regular column covers developments in American politics and government for an international audience. Potolicchio's book chapters on religion and politics have been published in volumes by Congressional Quarterly Press and Oxford University Press.

References

External links
 Official website
 Global and Custom Education, McCourt School of Public Policy, Georgetown University
 RANEPA Global Governance and Leadership Undergraduate Degree Program
 Preparing Global Leaders Forum
 Preparing Global Leaders Institute (Croatia)
 Preparing Global Leaders Summit (Russia)
 Preparing Global Leaders Academy (Jordan)

Living people
Political science educators
McCourt School of Public Policy faculty
Georgetown University alumni
Harvard Divinity School alumni
American nonprofit executives
Year of birth missing (living people)